Quijote TV is a Venezuelan community television channel.  It was created in March 2006 and can be seen in the Sucre Municipality of the Zulia State of Venezuela on UHF channel 69.  Jairo Almao and Jorge Barreto are the legal representatives of the foundation that owns this channel.

Quijote TV does not have a website.

See also
List of Venezuelan television channels

Television networks in Venezuela
Television stations in Venezuela
2006 establishments in Venezuela
Television channels and stations established in 2006
Television in Venezuela
Spanish-language television stations